The Kansas State League was a minor league baseball league in the United States that operated in the state of Kansas in the late 19th century and into the early 20th century.

History

The Kansas State League was first established in 1887 as a Minor League Baseball "no classification" league and existed for that year only.

The league continued again and played in 1895 to 1896 as a "no classification" league.

Progressing into the 20th century, the circuit played in 1905–1906 as a class D league and this stint lasted two years.

The last segment of the league operated as a class D league from 1909–1911, and 1913–1914. The original Kansas State League ceased operation in 1911, merged with the Central Kansas League, and the 1912 season was played under the CKL name. In 1913, the CKL switched back to the Kansas State League name. After the 1914 season the league permanently disbanded.

Cities represented 

Arkansas City, KS: Arkansas City 1887; Arkansas City Grays 1910
Arkansas City, KS & Winfield, KS: Arkansas City-Winfield Twins 1909;
Atchison, KS: Atchison Huskers 1897-1898 
Bartlesville, OK: Bartlesville Indians 1906 
Chanute, KS: Chanute 1896; Chanute Browns 1906
Cherryvale, KS: Cherryvale Boosters 1906
Clay Center, KS: Clay Center Colts 1913  
Coffeyville, KS: Coffeyville 1896; Coffeyville Bricks 1906  
El Dorado, KS: El Dorado Crushers 1911 
Ellsworth, KS: Ellsworth 1905; Emporia Bidwells 1914  
Emporia, KS: Emporia Reds 1887; Emporia Maroons 1895, 1897 
Fort Scott, KS: Fort Scott Giants 1906 
Great Bend, KS: Great Bend Millers 1905, 1909-1911, 1913-1914 
Hoisington, KS: Hoisington 1905 
Hutchinson, KS: Hutchinson Salt Miners 1905; Hutchinson Salt Packers 1909-1911; Hutchinson Packers 1914  
Independence, KS: Independence 1896; Independence Coyotes 1906  
Iola, KS: Iola Grays 1906 
Joplin, MO: Joplin 1887
Junction City, KS: Junction City Parrots 1897; Junction City Soldiers 1913
Kingman, KS: Kingman 1905 
Larned, KS: Larned Cowboys 1909; Larned Wheat Kings 1910-1911 
Leavenworth, KS: Leavenworth Soldiers 1895 
Lincoln Center, KS: Lincoln Center 1905 
Lyons, KS: Lyons Lions 1909-1911, 1913
Manhattan, KS: Manhattan Giants 1913
McPherson, KS: McPherson Merry Macks 1909-1911
Minneapolis, KS: Minneapolis Minnies 1905 
Newton, KS: Newton Railroaders 1909-1911 
Ottawa, KS: Ottawa 1898
Parsons, KS: Parsons Parsons 1896; Parsons Preachers 1906 
Pittsburg, KS: Pittsburg Champs 1906
Salina, KS: Salina/Junction City/Salina Blues 1898; Salina Insurgents 1913; Salina Coyotes 1914
Strong City, KS & Cottonwood Falls, KS: Strong City-Cottonwood Falls Twin Cities 1909 
Topeka, KS: Topeka Giants 1895, 1898; Topeka Colts 1897
Troy, KS: Troy Browns 1895 
Vinita, OK: Vinita 1906
Webb City, MO: Webb City 1887
Wellington, KS: Wellington Browns 1887; Wellington Dukes 1909-1911 
Whiting, KS/Horton, KS: Whiting-Horton 1895 
Wichita, KS: Wichita Braves 1887; Wichita Blues 1898
Winfield, KS: Winfield 1887

League overview

Standings & statistics
1887 Kansas State League 
 Wichita dropped out to enter the Western League July 21; Joplin entered July 26 and then disbanded August 4; Webb City entered the league July 28 and then disbanded August 4; Winfield entered league July 6th, disbanded July 15th.  The league folded August 8 

 1895 Kansas State League  
 Leavenworth (7-10) suspended July 22 and Whiting-Horton took the franchise 
1896 Kansas State League 
Parsons disbanded August 10, causing the league to fold August 20

1905 Kansas State League 

Lincoln Center and Great Bend joined the league on July 6; Kingman disbanded on July 22 and Hoisington took Kingman's place July 24.
Two No–Hitters were thrown in 1905. One by Lefty Holmes of Great Bend, and the other by Salter of Minneapolis.

1906 Kansas State League 
Pittsburg moved to Vinita June 6; Iola moved to Cherryvale on June 15; Fort Scott and Vinita disbanded on July 5. The league discarded all games played before July 10 and the season was restarted.

1909 Kansas State League 
The city of Winfield, Kansas bought partial interest in the Arkansas City franchise on July 22; Strong City–Cottonwood Falls moved to Larned July 12.

1910 Kansas State League 

1911 Kansas State League 
Wellington played 10 home games in Wichita, Kansas from June 11 to June 23.The league disbanded on July 11 due to crop failures and drought.  No individual statistics available.
1913 Kansas State League 
After Junction City disbanded  July 9, the league dropped Manhattan on July 10.

1914 Kansas State League

Sources
Encyclopedia of Minor League Baseball (1997, second edition), edited by W. Lloyd Johnson]and Miles Wolff

Defunct minor baseball leagues in the United States
Baseball leagues in Kansas
Sports leagues established in 1887
Sports leagues disestablished in 1914
1887 establishments in Kansas
1914 disestablishments in Kansas
Baseball leagues in Oklahoma
Baseball leagues in Missouri